BRH could refer to:

 Banque de la République d'Haïti
 Bark River-Harris School District
 Bethlem Royal Hospital
 Borth railway station, Wales; National Rail station code BRH.
 Brahui language; ISO 639-3 language code brh.
 Brookhaven (Amtrak station), Mississippi, United States; Amtrak station code BRH.
 Hydrogen bromide
 Blonde Redhead, a band